Wilhelmsthal is a municipality in the district of Kronach in Bavaria, Germany.

References

Kronach (district)